A Laois County Council election was held in County Laois in Ireland on 24 May 2019 as part of that year's local elections. 19 councillors were elected for a five-year term of office from 3 local electoral areas (LEAs) by single transferable vote. Following a recommendation of the 2018 LEA boundary review committee, the electoral division of Clash mas moved to Borris-in-Ossory—Mountmellick LEA from Portlaoise LEA, to take account of population changes revealed by the 2016 census.

Results by party

Results by local electoral area

Borris in Ossory–Mountmellick

Graiguecullen–Portarlington

Portlaoise

Results by gender

Footnotes

Sources

References

2019 Irish local elections
2019